Eupsilia is a genus of moths of the family Noctuidae.

The taxonomy is in question. One possibility is: subfamily Noctuinae, tribe Xylenini, subtribe Xylenina (Bugguide.net). Another alternative is: Subfamily Hadeninae (Biolib).

Species
 Eupsilia boursini Sugi, 1958
 Eupsilia cirripalea Franclemont, 1952
 Eupsilia confusa Owada & Kobayashi, 1993
 Eupsilia contracta (Butler, 1878)
 Eupsilia cuprea Hreblay & Ronkay, 1998
 Eupsilia devia (Grote, 1874)
 Eupsilia fringata (Barnes & McDunnough, 1916)
 Eupsilia hidakaensis Sugi, 1987
 Eupsilia knowltoni McDunnough, 1946
 Eupsilia kurenzovi Kononenko, 1976
 Eupsilia morrisoni (Grote, 1874)
 Eupsilia parashyu Hreblay & Ronkay, 1998
 Eupsilia quadrilinea (Leech, 1889)
 Eupsilia quinquelinea Boursin, 1956
 Eupsilia shyu Chang, 1991
 Eupsilia sidus (Guenée, 1852)
 Eupsilia silla Kononenko & Ahn, 1998
 Eupsilia strigifera Butler, 1879
 Eupsilia transversa – Satellite (Hufnagel, 1766)
 Eupsilia tripunctata Butler, 1878
 Eupsilia tristigmata (Grote, 1877)
 Eupsilia unipuncta Scriba, 1919
 Eupsilia vinulenta (Grote, 1864)
 Eupsilia virescens Yoshimoto, 1985

References
 Eupsilia at Markku Savela's Lepidoptera and Some Other Life Forms
 Natural History Museum Lepidoptera genus database
 Bugguide.net. Genus Eupsilia